Irene Wimala Kannangara (15 June 1920 - January 2006) was a Sri Lankan politician and a former member of the Parliament of Sri Lanka. At the 8th parliamentary election, held on 21 July 1977, she was elected to the seat of Galigamuwa. Kannangara, the United National Party candidate, received 18,608 (54% of the total vote) defeating the Sri Lanka Freedom Party nominee, Jagathsiri Balasuriya, who polled 14,853 (43% of the total vote).

References

1920 births
Members of the 4th Parliament of Ceylon
Members of the 6th Parliament of Ceylon
Members of the 8th Parliament of Sri Lanka
2006 deaths